Sugam Pokharel (Nepali:सुगम पाेखरेल) is a Nepalese singer, music composer, songwriter, and radio jockey known for his contribution towards Nepali pop music. His first solo recording, Mero Sansaar (2001), became a top seller in Nepal.  He gained recognition from the mass, particularly the youths, in the early 2000s, when pop music was not particularly popular among the general public. Because of this, he is seen as one of the most prominent figures in Nepali pop music.

Early life career
Sugam Pokharel was born in Mangalbare, Morang in 1979. His father was a government scribe in the Department of Land Reform Management, but was also known as an  advocate in the locality. His elder brother, Sunil Pokharel is a theater artist.

After completion of School Leaving Certificate (Nepal) from Biratnagar, Sugam moved to Kathmandu for his high school education. Initially having no desire to record music as a professional singer or to pursue a career as a pop singer, he decided to record a song when he met Sudin Pokharel in Kathmandu, who was also willing to record the song. They both recorded their first song, Ma Maya Garchu at NAAD Studio, Anamnagar in 1995, which was a disaster. After their unsuccessful debut, they came together to record another song four months after their first release. The second release was titled Payera Timilai Yesto Khusi Chhu. It was not successful. Although facing two biggest flops in their debut career, their paramount desire for recording hit songs didn't halt them from recording their third song, Panchi. This also didn't do well in the market and the collaboration between Sugam and Sudin ended.

Radio career
In 1997, Sugam started working as a librarian at Radio Sagarmatha, Nepal's first community radio, in the aftermath of three biggest flops in his early singing career with Sudin Pokharel. Later on, he started hosting a musical program.

Musical career
After back-to-back failures working with Sudin Pokharel a.k.a. DA69, he began his  solo career with  album 1MB, released in 2001. His first recorded song is Sayad Mero Prita. His initial songs like Feri Tyo Din, Kati Din Bitey, Maya Ko Baato, Samhalinchha Kaile Mann, and Timi Ma Bhanda established himself as Pop Star. His albums are Highway, Sutra, Yatra, School Pathshala, Sugam Song Geet. 

He often worked with Sudin Pokhrel (a.k.a. Rapper DA69) who also comes from his hometown Biratnagar. "The Unity" band (Rapper DA69, VJ Asif Shah, Aidray) were mostly associated with him in songs like Aaja Feri Din Bityo. Girish Khatiwada who hails from his hometown Biratnagar, also was associated with him.

He also worked as one of the three judges of Nepali singing reality show Nepal Idol for season 4, after the original three judges from previous three seasons were busy with another project.

Awards

References

External links
 

1979 births
Living people
21st-century Nepalese male singers
Nepalese pop singers
People from Morang District
People from Biratnagar
Bahun
Nepalese Hindus
Nepali radio presenters